The Central District of Hurand County is in East Azerbaijan province, Iran. At the National Census in 2006, its population (as parts of Ahar County before the creation of Hurand County) was 14,287 in 3,142 households. The following census in 2011 counted 13,477 people in 3,553 households. At the latest census in 2016, the district had 13,008 inhabitants in 3,900 households. Since the establishment of Hurand County, the Central District has been structured as follows:

References 

Districts of East Azerbaijan Province

Populated places in East Azerbaijan Province

fa:بخش مرکزی شهرستان هوراند